RFA Tiderace may refer to:

 , Tide-class replenishment oiler of the Royal Fleet Auxiliary, originally named Tiderace, in service 1956–1975; 

Royal Fleet Auxiliary ship names